Salpingitis isthmica nodosa (SIN), also known as diverticulosis of the Fallopian tube, is nodular thickening of the narrow part of the  uterine tube, due to inflammation.

Signs and symptoms
SIN is associated with infertility and ectopic pregnancy, and may present as either.

Pathology
It is characterized by nodular thickening of the tunica muscularis of the narrow (isthmic) portion of the Fallopian tube. In severe cases, it leads to complete obliteration of the tubal lumen. It is uncommonly bilateral.

Gross Findings:
 One or more nodules 1–2 mm, spanning up to 2 cm
 Smooth serosa

Microscopic Findings:
 Glandular epithelium within tubal muscularis propria, in continuation with mucosa or (more commonly) discontinuous
 Haphazard distribution (akin to adenomyosis) or pseudoinfiltrative
 Banal epithelium with tubal differentiation

Diagnosis
Hysterosalpingography, a common technique in the work-up of infertility, is reliable in the diagnosis of SIN, which is seen as small globular collections within the tubal wall, either discontinuous or in continuity with the tubal lumen. Tubal obstruction and hydrosalpinx are commonly seen as well. Other techniques include laparoscopic chromopertubation, salpingoscopy, and transvaginal hydrolaparoscopy (the latter allows visualization of the tubal mucosa)

Treatment
Once suspected clinically and radiologically, patients with infertility and SIN can be managed with segmental resection with tubo-cornual anastomosis, and recanalization if tubal obstruction is detected. Success with gonadotrophin-releasing hormone analogues (GnRH-a) has been documented in terms of remission of nodularity and tubal patency. If fertility preservation is not desired, salpingectomy is recommended.

See also
 Vasitis nodosa
 Salpingitis

References

Noninflammatory disorders of female genital tract
Gynaecologic disorders
Human female reproductive system
Human female endocrine system